Karposhtli-ye Baghi (also Romanized as Karposhtlī-ye Bāghī) is a village in Jargalan Rural District, Raz and Jargalan District, Bojnord County, North Khorasan Province, Iran. At the 2006 census, its population was 712, in 180 families.

References 

Populated places in Bojnord County